Mark Begich (born 1962) is a former United States Senator from Alaska. Senator Begich may also refer to:

Nick Begich (1932–1972), member of the Alaska State Senate
Tom Begich (born 1960), member of the Alaska State Senate